The 1912 Chicago Maroons football team was an American football team that represented the University of Chicago during the 1912 college football season.  In their 20th season under head coach Amos Alonzo Stagg, the Maroons compiled a 6–1 record, finished in second place in the Western Conference, and outscored all opponents by a combined total of 86 to 44.

Schedule

Roster

Head coach: Amos Alonzo Stagg (21st year at Chicago)

References

Chicago
Chicago Maroons football seasons
Chicago Maroons football